José Carranza may refer to:

 José Andrés Carranza (fl. 1974–1989), Peruvian football forward
 José Luis Carranza (born 1964), Peruvian football midfielder
 Jose Carranza (soccer, born 1999), American soccer midfielder
 José León de Carranza Bridge, bridge in Cádiz, Spain